Sisavang Vatthana or sometimes Savang Vatthana (full title: Samdach Brhat Chao Mavattaha Sri Vitha Lan Xang Hom Khao Phra Rajanachakra Lao Phengdara Parama Sidha Khattiya Suriya Varman Brhat Maha Sri Savangsa Vadhana; 13 November 1907 – 13 May 1978) was the last king of the Kingdom of Laos and the 6th Prime Minister of Laos serving from 29 October to 21 November 1951. He ruled from 1959 after his father's death until his forced abdication in 1975. His rule ended with the takeover by the Pathet Lao in 1975, after which he and his family were sent to a re-education camp by the new government.

Early life
Prince Savang Vatthana was born on 13 November 1907 at the Royal Palace of Luang Prabang, the son of King Sisavang Vong and Queen Kham-Oun I. He was the second of five children along with Princess Khampheng, Princess Sammathi, Prince Sayasack, and Prince Souphantharangsri. He was also a distant cousin of Prince Souvanna Phouma and Prince Souphanouvong. At the age of 10, Prince Savang was sent to study in France. He attended a lycée in Montpellier and obtained a degree from École Libre des Sciences Politiques (now called Sciences Po) in Paris, where French diplomats were trained. The young heir continued his studies in France, and after a decade overseas, he could no longer speak Lao. Upon his return, he had to be instructed by a palace functionary for years.

On 7 August 1930, he married Queen Khamphoui and they had five children, Crown Prince Vong Savang, Prince Sisavang Savang, Prince Sauryavong Savang, Princess Savivanh Savang, and Princess Thala Savang. The family played tennis together, and liked to attend major tournaments on their travels abroad. The prince was also a devout Buddhist and became an authority on the Sangha, and would later take his role as protector of the state religion seriously.

During World War II, he represented his father with the Japanese forces. His father sent him to the Japanese headquarters in Saigon, where he vigorously protested about the Japanese actions, when they invaded Laos and forced them to declare independence from France.

King of Laos

In 1951, Savang served as Prime Minister, and when his father became ill on 20 August 1959, he was named Regent. On 29 October 1959, he informally acceded upon the death of his father. He was, however, never officially crowned king, deferring his coronation until the cessation of civil war.

The king was active in politics as he was trying to stabilize Laos after the political turmoil started with the Geneva Conference of July 1954, which granted full independence to the country but did not settle the issue of who would rule. As a result, the position of Prime Minister was disputed between three princes: Prince Souvanna Phouma, a neutralist, operated from Vientiane, whose claim was recognized by the Soviet Union; Prince Boun Oum of Champassak in the south, right-wing and pro-United States, dominated the Pakse area and was recognized as Prime Minister by the US; and in the far north, Prince Souphanouvong led the leftist Pathet Lao resistance movement, drawing support from North Vietnam and having his claim backed of the Communists. To avoid argument over whether any of the three princes was the "legitimate" Prime Minister, all sides would deal through the pro-Western king.

In 1961, a majority of the National Assembly had already voted Boun Oum into power and the king left Luang Prabang, visiting the capital to give the new government his blessing. In 1962, the king formed a coalition government which soon collapsed.

In March 1963, accompanied by his Prime Minister, Souvanna Phouma, the king toured 13 countries signatory to the Geneva Conference that guaranteed the "neutrality" of the Kingdom of Laos on "diplomatic missions", starting with the USSR, where he received gifts of GAZ-13 "Chaika" limousines, before meeting US President John F. Kennedy in Washington, D.C.

In 1964, a series of coups and countercoups resulted in the final alignment of the Pathet Lao on one side and the neutralist and right-wing factions on the other. From this point, the Pathet Lao refused to join any offers of coalition or national elections and the Laotian Civil War began.

Abdication and death
On 23 August 1975, Pathet Lao forces entered Vientiane, the last city to be captured. The Phouma Government became effectively powerless for the next few months. On 2 December, Vatthana was forced to abdicate the throne by the Pathet Lao, abolishing the 600-year-old monarchy, and was appointed to the meaningless position of "Supreme Advisor to the President". He refused to leave the country and in 1976 he surrendered the royal palace to the Lao Government, which turned it into a museum, and moved to a nearby private residence where he was later placed under house arrest. In March 1977, fearing Vatthana might escape to lead a resistance, the Communist authorities arrested him along with the Queen, Crown Prince Vong Savang, Prince Sisavang, and his brothers Princes Souphantharangsri and Thongsouk and sent them to the northern province of Viengxai. He was transported to Xam Neua and imprisoned in "Camp Number One," which held high-ranking officials from the former government.  During his time in the camp, he and other members of the royal family were allowed to move freely around their compounds during the day, and were often visited by members of the politburo, including Sopuhanouvong himself. Vatthana was the oldest prisoner in the camp and turned 70 during the earlier months of his imprisonment, whereas the average age of prisoners was around 55.

In 1978, the government reported that Vatthana, Queen Khamphoui, and Crown Prince Vong Savang had died from malaria. The World Press Review reported that they had suffered from the effects of forced labor and starvation. More recent accounts suggest that the King died in mid-March 1980. However, according to Kaysone Phomvihane, Vatthana died in 1984, at the age of 77. Following the deaths of Vatthana and the Crown Prince, the King's youngest son, Sauryavong Savang, became the head of the Laotian royal family, acting as regent for his nephew Crown Prince, Soulivong Savang, until the regent died in Paris in 2018.

Issue
The children of Savang Vatthana and Khumphoui as follows:

See also

King Sisavang Vong
Monarchs of Laos
Pathet Lao
Kingdom of Laos
Soth Phetrasy
Laotian Royal Family

References

External links

Photographs of Royal Family of Laos
Death of King Savang Vatthana reported

|-

|-

|-
|-

Laotian royalty
20th-century murdered monarchs
1907 births
1978 deaths
Monarchs of Laos
Pretenders to the Laotian throne
Prime Ministers of Laos
People from Luang Prabang
Laotian anti-communists
Knights Grand Cross of the Royal Order of Cambodia
Prisoners who died in Laotian detention
Laotian people who died in prison custody